The 2012 Ginetta GT Supercup is a multi-event, one make GT motor racing championship held across England and Scotland. The championship features a mix of professional motor racing teams and privately funded drivers, competing in a Ginetta G55 or Ginetta G50 that conform to the technical regulations for the championship. It forms part of the extensive program of support categories built up around the BTCC centrepiece.

This season will be the second Ginetta GT Supercup, having rebranded from the Ginetta G50 Cup, which ran between 2008 and 2010.

Teams and drivers

Race calendar and results
The series will last for 27 races over 10 rounds, and will support the British Touring Car Championship at all rounds.

Championship standings
A driver's best 25 scores counted towards the championship, with any other points being discarded.

References

External links
 

Ginetta GT Supercup